Simlebreen (Lule Sámi: Vátjamjåkjiehkke) is a glacier in Beiarn, Nordland, Norway. The  glacier lies about  North of the much larger glacier named Svartisen, making it the 18th largest glacier on the Norwegian mainland. The mountain Simletinden lies on the East side of the glacier, reaching a height of 1,329 m (4,360 ft).

See also
List of glaciers in Norway

References

Glaciers of Norway
Glaciers of Nordland
Beiarn